Kovur is a village  in Nellore district of the Indian state of Andhra Pradesh.  The village is also the headquarters of the Kovur Mandal and Assembly Constituency. It is located in Kovur mandal of Nellore revenue division. It forms a part of Nellore Urban Development Authority. The poet "Thikkanna" was born in this place.

Geography 

Penna River is the major river flows in the proximity of the village.

Demographics 

 census, Kovur had a population of 32,082. The total population constitute, 15,640 males and 16,442 females —a sex ratio of 1,051 females per 1,000 males. 3,196 children are in the age group of 0–6 years, of which 1,659 are boys and 1,537 are girls. The average literacy rate stands at 74.45% with 21,506 literates, significantly higher than the state average of 67.41%.

Government and politics 

Kovur gram panchayat is the local self-government of the village. The panchayat has a total of 20 wards with an elected ward member. The present sarpanch of the village is Kutla Uma and vice-sarpanch is Intha Malla Reddy. Kovur in Kovur mandal is represented by Kovur assembly constituency of Andhra Pradesh Legislative Assembly. The present MLA representing the constituency is Prasanna kumar Reddy of  YSR Congress. It forms a part in Nellore Urban Development Authority. The present chairman is Kotamreddy Sreenivasulu reddy.

Economy 
Paddy (unboiled rice) sugarcane is the major Agricultural crop produced. The L.Vannamei variety of Shrimp farming is the major Aquaculture production in and around Kovur.

Transport 
National Highway 16, a part of Golden Quadrilateral project, bypasses Kovur village. Padugupadu railway station provides rail connectivity and is situated on Vijayawada-Gudur section of Howrah-Chennai main line. It is administered under Vijayawada railway division of South Central Railway zone. National Highway 67 bypasses through Kovur village.

Notable Persons

 Tikkana Somayaji born in Patur Village, Kovur Mandal

Education 
The primary and secondary school education is imparted by government, aided and private schools, under the School Education Department of the state. The total number of students enrolled in primary, upper primary and high schools of the village are 1,731. There are 15 schools which include, six private, eight Mandal Parishad and ZPHS, and other types of school as well.

References

External links 
village

Towns in Nellore district